Leonid Mikhaylovich Sandalov (10 April 1900, Vichuga, Ivanovo Oblast – October 23, 1987) was a Soviet military leader with the rank of colonel-general. During World War II, he led staffs of the armies and fronts. After the war, he led the staffs of military districts, he was Deputy Chief of Staff of the Army. A talented and prolific memoirist and military analyst. Honorary Citizen of Vichuga, Kobrin, and Riga.

Honours and awards
 Three Orders of Lenin (1943,1945,1970)
 Order of the Red Banner, four times (1942, 1943, 1944, 1950)
 Order of Suvorov, 1st class (23 May 1945)
 Order of Kutuzov, 1st class (27 August 1943)
 Order of the Red Star (22 February 1941)
 Order of the Patriotic War, 1st class (1985)
 Order of the October Revolution (1980)
 Jubilee Medal "In Commemoration of the 100th Anniversary since the Birth of Vladimir Il'ich Lenin"
 Medal "For the Defence of Moscow"
 Medal "For the Victory over Germany in the Great Patriotic War 1941–1945"
 Jubilee Medal "Twenty Years of Victory in the Great Patriotic War 1941-1945"
 Jubilee Medal "Thirty Years of Victory in the Great Patriotic War 1941-1945"
 Jubilee Medal "Forty Years of Victory in the Great Patriotic War 1941-1945"
 Medal "For the Liberation of Prague"
 Jubilee Medal "XX Years of the Workers' and Peasants' Red Army"
 Jubilee Medal "30 Years of the Soviet Army and Navy"
 Jubilee Medal "40 Years of the Armed Forces of the USSR"
 Jubilee Medal "50 Years of the Armed Forces of the USSR"
 Jubilee Medal "60 Years of the Armed Forces of the USSR"
 Medal "In Commemoration of the 800th Anniversary of Moscow"

References 

1900 births
1987 deaths
People from Vichuga
Recipients of the Order of Lenin
Recipients of the Order of the Red Banner
Recipients of the Order of Suvorov, 1st class
Recipients of the Order of Kutuzov, 1st class
Soviet colonel generals
Soviet military personnel of World War II
Frunze Military Academy alumni
Military Academy of the General Staff of the Armed Forces of the Soviet Union alumni